Lesbian, gay, bisexual and transgender (LGBT) people living in Bahrain face legal challenges and discrimination not experienced by non-LGBT residents, although Bahrain is among the few countries in the Middle East and Arab world where homosexuality is legal. However, other vague laws against indecency are used to target gender and sexual minorities. Discussion of homosexuality has also been allowed in Bahrain since the 1990s.

Same-sex activity was illegal in Bahrain while it was British Protectorate, however a new Penal Code enacted in 1976 removed any laws prohibiting consensual acts between adults regardless of gender. Attempts have been made to restrict the rights of LBGT individuals, however none have gone through. Individuals have also been able to change their legal gender since June 2007.

Legality of same-sex sexual acts
Homosexual acts were first criminalised in Bahrain as sodomy while it was a protectorate of the British. Similar laws were imposed throughout the British Empire in nearly all of its colonies; these were mostly modelled on the original 1860 Section 377, introduced in India by the Raj.

A new Penal Code was enacted in March 1976, repealing the Penal Code of the Persian Gulf that was imposed by the British.  The new penal code does not prohibit private, non-commercial acts of homosexuality between consenting adults; for the purposes of this law, "adults" are at least 21 years old. 

Although no law explicitly criminalizes same-sex relations, authorities have used vague penal code provisions against "indecency" and "immorality" to target sexual and gender minorities. There is no law that prohibits discrimination on the grounds of gender identity or sexual orientation. Although no legislation specifically criminalises same-sex relationships, authorities have targeted sexual and gender minorities by using ambiguous penal code sections against "indecency" and "immorality" (fujoor). There is no legislation prohibiting discrimination based on gender identity or sexual orientation. There are several other parts of the penal code that can be used against LGBT people.

In September 2013, it was announced that all Gulf Cooperative Countries had agreed to discuss a proposal to establish some form of, yet unknown, testing in order to ban gay foreigners from entering any of the countries. However, it has been suggested that concern for hosting 2022 FIFA World Cup in Qatar, and fears for controversy in a case that football fans would have been screened, made officials backtrack the plans and insist that it was a mere proposal.

In October 2021, members of parliament proposed a bill to amend the penal code; this would include renaming one of its chapters "Debauchery, Prostitution, and Perversion", and the addition of two articles criminalizing "[raising] a flag, slogan, or any sign symbolizing homosexuals", "[promoting] the ideas and beliefs of homosexuals" and "[inviting, organizing or attending] any gathering or meeting of homosexuals", punishable by up to 5 years' imprisonment and a fine of 3,000-5,000 dinars. The term used in the bill to refer to homosexuals is the derogatory "Al-shawadh Jinsian".

Related penal code concerns

Article 324 of the penal code prohibits enticing another person to commit prostitution or "fojoor" (which translates to "immorality" and seems to have vagueness in terms of its legal definition). This particular law has increasingly been used to crack down on men who wear women's clothing in public.
Articles 325-327 involves forcing of others to become prostitutes.
Article 328 of the penal code prohibits running a place for prostitution or fojoor.
Article 329 of the penal code prohibits people from public solicitation involving prostitution or fojoor.
Article 330 of the penal code states that anyone who is charged with an act of prostitution or fujoor is to be taken to a hospital and tested for sexually transmitted diseases. If they have such diseases, the law stipulates that they be relocated to a medical facility for treatment.
Article 350 of the penal code prohibits any sort of public indecency.
Article 354 of the penal code prohibits cursing or using words or signs on a street or other public place for the purposes of indulging in immoral behavior.

Articles 324, 329 and 350 can be used against Homosexuals, this means that any citizen caught doing something that does not follow local Islamic traditions then they would be arrested (e.g a local Gay couple showing affection in public, owning a rainbow flag, or even declaring one's own homosexuality can be considered public immorality and promoting "fujoor").

For Bahraini Muslims, marriage is defined and otherwise regulated by The National Personal Status Law (2017), which does not recognize same-sex marriages.

Government statements

The Al-Menbar Islamic Society is one of the more successful political factions within the Parliament. As a lawful Islamist political group it has pushed for more conservative social policies, including a crackdown on LGBT people.

In response to questions from parliament about lesbianism in schools, the Assistant Under-Secretary for Educational Services Khalid Al Alawi has said that the Education Ministry is not responsible for addressing issues of sexuality, and instead it is the responsibility of parents to take care of their children's emotional development: "Any emotional problems should be dealt with by their parents – it is not up to the school to take actions on this problem. The public shouldn't make a big deal out of this problem because it does not exist." Speaking about the government's attitude, Mr Al Alawi said that "As for the question that has been raised in the Press about the so-called problem of lesbianism, as a ministry we cannot talk about a widespread phenomenon and we can't call them lesbians. The problems that the students are facing are put into the category of educational problems, not immoral acts. If a student's appearance is contrary to custom and the schools values, then the only thing we can say is that those violating the school's rules should be disciplined."

In 2008, a harsher crackdown on same-sex sexual acts was called for by members of the Al Menbar parliamentary bloc. The government is being asked to conduct an official study into the problem of same-sex sexual acts and how to best combat them.  The initial response from the government was as follows;

 The Interior Minister says that "suspected" (effeminate) homosexuals are banned from entering Bahrain by checks at the airport.
 The Interior Minister says that many male homosexuals choose a profession in hairdressing salons and beauty and massage spas, which the Minister says are often inspected.

The government crackdown against cross-dressing appears to have begun a year later. In 2009, two Asian foreigners were sentenced to six months in jail, with hard labor, and later deportation for offering to have sex with undercover police offices in exchange for money at a Male Barbershop [14 January 2009 – Bahraini Newspaper, *Alwaqht,*]

In February 2009, a 39-year-old man was sentenced to a month in jail for wearing women's clothing in public, namely an abaya and purse.

In 2011, police raided a party that was described in the press as a same-sex wedding ceremony.

Other pending bills would expressly ban LGBT foreigners from entering the kingdom or receiving residency permits as well as plans to instruct children's teachers in apparent warning signs of homosexuality or cross-dressing, so that the children can be punished.

In 2018, during its participation in the meeting of the Democracy and Human Rights Committee, the Parliamentary Division of the Kingdom of Bahrain objected to the re-raising of the issue “regarding the role of parliaments in ending discrimination based on sexual orientation, and respecting the rights of gays, bisexuals, transgender people, and intersex persons.” The deputy d. Jamila al-Sammak, a member of the Parliamentary Division, said that "this proposal contradicts the natural composition of life, which consists of a man and a woman, just as all monotheistic religions, foremost among which the Islamic religion, have prohibited homosexuality and considered it a departure from the natural scope and the proper formation of life. Therefore, the Division believes that it is necessary to respect the privacy of societies in that matter."

In June 2021, the US Embassy and members of the US Navy base in Bahrain, celebrated Pride Month by raising the rainbow flag and posting about it on social media, prompting the state's Bahrain News Agency (BNA) and all local newspapers to publish several articles in Arabic condemning homosexuality, homosexuals, and even the US embassy.

The President of the Bahraini Educators Union, Safia Shamsan, described the statement of the Supreme Council for Islamic Affairs and its support for the statement of Al-Azhar Al-Sharif as "a right stance that we all support." And she explained that "what is constant in the laws of the earth is the common sense that Allah instilled in us and that is reinforced and protected by the heavenly religions." Shamsan claimed that it is "important to stand against the issue of "alshudhudh aljinsi" (homosexuality) and preventing its promotion through a systematic and fraudulent media" 

In the same year, Ma'an (Arabic: معاً), a Bahraini human rights organization, issued an article on BNA in Arabic titled "We support the statement of the Islamic Supreme Council and call for respect for Islamic and societal values", calling for "protection of society from all manifestations of "Shudhudh" (homosexuality) and attacks on Islamic and societal principles and values." BNA and the local Bahraini newspapers accused Qatar of "promoting homosexuality" in the then upcoming FIFA World Cup.

In June 2022, coinciding with pride month again, the US Embassy raised a rainbow flag and celebrated pride on their social media accounts, which instigated BNA and all local government allied newspapers (including Al-Ayam; a self identified liberal newspaper) to publish several articles (in Arabic) condemning, attacking homosexuals (and calling them Shawadh), and attacking the US Embassy itself, and claiming that all religions are against homosexuality, in addition to pseudoscientific Anti-Gay propaganda by saying no one is born Gay and portraying Monkeypox as a Gay Plague.

Some of the more lawful liberal and leftist political groups within Bahrain have expressed opposition to introducing Sharia law into the Bahraini penal code, but none of them have expressed support for LGBT rights.

False accusations

Sometimes false accusations of homosexuality, or anti-gay innuendos, are levied against critics of the Bahraini government in an effort to discredit political or sectarian dissent.  In a society where being gay is widely perceived as a vice or bad habit, accusing people of being gay, even in jest, can be an effective means of bullying reformers.

Human rights advocate Nabeel Rajab has been subjected to such accusations by people on social media.  Similar insults have been launched at Sheikh Ali Salman, with some Twitter users referring to his Shia political party as "Al Wefag".

Similarly, false accusations were circulated about the 2011 pro-democracy protesters gathered in Pearl Square.  Participants of the protests were accused of engaging in all sorts of sexual immorality in an effort to discredit the protester's demands.

Freedom of speech

The press in Bahrain has, since the 1990s, generally been allowed to discuss the subject of homosexuality, without being punished by the government.  Initially, the discussion was focused on people and events happening outside of Bahrain, especially in the field of entertainment or the AIDS-HIV pandemic.  In the early part of the twenty-first century, the Bahraini press has begun to address sexual orientation, gender identity, and the AIDS-HIV pandemic as they apply to the island.

In 2001, the Arabic language newspaper Al-Meethaq created a national controversy when it became the first newspaper to discuss homosexuality in Bahrain.

On 21 December 2005, the Bahrain-based newspaper Gulf Daily News British columnist Les Horton wrote a commentary. This is probably the first time that a column expressing support for LGBT rights was published in a Bahraini newspaper, albeit an English language publication.

Bahraini citizens who criticize or mock islamic scripture can be imprisoned for up to a whole year, An unidentified female Bahraini citizen who mocked islamic scripture on Twitter, was reported by people and this got her subsequently arrested.

The Gulf Daily News has continued to write articles that touch upon homosexuality and gender identity. For example, it has published several articles on Bahraini female homosexuality in girls' high schools and Bahraini women who claim to have become lesbians based on abusive relationships with men.

Derogatory terminology
Arabic publications in Bahrain and the majority of Arabic speaking Islamic countries, including laws, commonly refer to Homosexuality and Homosexuals as:Shudhudh or Shudhudh Jinsi: used to refer to Paraphilia and sexual paraphilia respectively.Shadh Jinsian ( - singular), Shawadh Jinsian ( - plural): meaning sexual paraphilic(s).Shadh ( - singular), and Shawadh ( - plural): Arabic meaning paraphilic(s), pervert(s) or deviant(s).

Which are terms used to denote "sexual paraphilia, perversion or deviation" such as Pedophilia. these terms are used to refer to "homosexuals" in a derogatory and dehumanizing context, contrary to using terms like:Mithleyya Jinsia which exclusively means homosexuality.Mithley-yeen which exclusively means homosexuals.Mithley which means Gay.Mithleya which means Lesbian.

Which are non-derogatory terms.

Other derogatory terms include:Lewat- Arabic equivalent to "Sodomy", in reference to the Biblical and Quranic figure Lot.Luti''' - Arabic equivalent to "Sodomite."

Gender identity and expression
In 2006, the Gulf Daily News'' published a story about a Bahraini man assigned female at birth who, having undergone a genital reconstruction surgery, was going to court in a bid to have his status as a man recognised in law.  The lawyer had won a landmark case in 2005 where the transgender Bahraini had the operation and was legally recognised as a man. The legal case was going through the Bahraini legal system until 2008 when the court granted the motion to allow the transgender man to change his legal documents and be recognised in his gender.

LGBT community

Bahrain's population is a culturally diverse mixture of citizens and foreign workers from many different countries.  This impacts how the LGBT community tends to function within the island.

LGBT foreign workers tend to socialize with other foreign workers that share the same language, if not nationality.  As non-citizens, they cannot really influence Bahrani policy and generally feel the need to be publicly discreet about their sexual or gender identity, to be able to continue working on the island.

Among Bahraini citizens, how open they can be about their sexual orientation or gender identity has a lot to do with how traditionalist or modern their family is.

Among the more traditionalist families, being LGBT is shameful and something that needs to be "cured" through medical therapy, an arranged marriage or physical violence.  More modern families can be more tolerant, but also concerned about their son or daughter facing harassment or discrimination.

Public opinion

According to the World Values Survey in 2011, 42% of Bahraini people believed that "homosexuality is never justified", which was lower than the world average of 48% who agreed with that statement. It was also more accepting than any other Arab countries surveyed. The same survey found that 18% of Bahraini people "would not like to have homosexuals as neighbors" which was among the lowest percentage in the world.

Human rights reports

2017 United States Department of State report
In 2017, the United States Department of State reported the following, concerning the status of LGBT rights in Bahrain:

Summary table

See also

Criminalisation of homosexuality
Human rights in Bahrain
LGBT rights in the Middle East
LGBT rights in Asia

References

External links
UK government travel advice for Bahrain: Local laws and customs

Human rights in Bahrain
Politics of Bahrain
Bahrain
Bahrain
LGBT in Bahrain